Jim Rosenhaus is a radio broadcaster for the Cleveland Guardians Major League Baseball team. Rosenhaus also hosts Guardians Warm Up and Guardians Weekly on WTAM.

Rosenhaus joined the Guardians (known as the Indians at the time of joining) in 2007 after spending 11 years as the play-by-play voice of the AAA Buffalo Bisons. Initially serving as the engineer/producer of the radio broadcast, in 2010 he eventually added the role of broadcaster to his responsibilities.  In 2012, he became Tom Hamilton's full-time partner following the retirement of Mike Hegan. Rosenhaus serves as the radio pregame host, is the play by play announcer during innings four and five, and does locker room interviews after the game (as well as other behind the scenes work).

With the Bisons, he called 1,628 games (just 44 contests shy of the all-time record for most in team history held by Pete Weber). Rosenhaus is the only broadcaster to call three Bisons championships (1997, 1998, 2004). He also was the play-by-play announcer for the 2002 AAA All-Star Game.

Rosenhaus also served as the voice of the University of Buffalo Bulls men's basketball team for 11 seasons and worked with the Toronto Blue Jays Radio Network, the Wilmington Blue Rocks and the Kinston Indians.

Rosenhaus graduated from Lafayette College in Easton, Pennsylvania where he was an economics major and computer science minor. Rosenhaus also was a runner on the Cross Country and Track teams at Lafayette and broadcast football, basketball, and baseball games for WJRH at Lafayette College.

In 2011, Rosenhaus was inducted into the Buffalo Baseball Hall of Fame along with former Major League Baseball player and American League Manager of the Year (2003) Tony Peña.

Rosenhaus had also called several televised events broadcast on SportsTime Ohio (now Bally Sports Great Lakes) including the Ohio High School Athletic Association football playoffs and high school basketball.

Broadcasting associates with the Indians/Guardians
Jim Rosenhaus has partnered with the following members of the Cleveland Guardians Radio Network (Flagship stations - WTAM 1100 AM/106.9 FM, WMMS 100.7 FM):

Mike Hegan, 2010–2011
Tom Hamilton, 2010–present

See also
 List of Cleveland Guardians broadcasters
 List of current Major League Baseball announcers

References

External links
Cleveland Guardians: Broadcasters

Year of birth missing (living people)
Living people
American radio sports announcers
American television sports announcers
College basketball announcers in the United States
High school basketball announcers in the United States
High school football announcers in the United States
College football announcers
Cleveland Guardians announcers
Lafayette College alumni
Major League Baseball broadcasters
Minor League Baseball broadcasters
Toronto Blue Jays announcers